HLI may refer to:

 Hacienda Luisita, a sugar plantation in the Philippines
 Healing railway station, in England
 Highland Light Infantry, a former regiment of the British Army
 Hollister Municipal Airport, in California, United States
 Human Life International, an American anti-abortion umbrella organization
 High Level Interface, a communications term = a type of connection that links data flows.